John Maddock (born 19 October 1951) is an Australian basketball player. He competed in the men's tournament at the 1976 Summer Olympics.

References

External links
 

1951 births
Living people
Australian men's basketball players
1974 FIBA World Championship players
Olympic basketball players of Australia
Basketball players at the 1976 Summer Olympics
Sportspeople from Hobart